Long intergenic non-protein coding RNA 674 is a Long non-coding RNA in humans that is encoded by the LINC00674 gene.

References